Colette Flesch (born 16 April 1937 in Dudelange) is a Luxembourgish politician and former fencer.

Life 
She gained a Bachelor of Arts degree in political science from Wellesley College in 1960, then earned an M.A. in International Affairs from the Fletcher School of Law and Diplomacy at Tufts University, before studying at The Hague Academy of International Law.

As a fencer she participated in the Individual foil events at the 1960, 1964 and 1968 Summer Olympics.

She worked for the European Economic Community in Brussels, specialising in the agricultural side of the Common Market for 5 years.

She has served in numerous political capacities, both in government and within the Democratic Party and the European Liberal Democrat and Reform Party. In December 1968 she was elected to the Chamber of Deputies in an early election. In 1970 she became the first female Mayor of Luxembourg City at the age of 32, which she remained until 1980. Besides her work in the Chamber of Deputies (1969-1980, 1984-1989 and 2004-2009), she was also a member of the European Parliament from 1969 to 1980, 1984 to 1985, 1989 to 1990, and 1999 to 2004.

In 1976, she became the General Secretary of the Democratic Party, and was its President from 1981 to 1989.

From 1980 to 1984 she was a member of Pierre Werner's government, as Deputy Prime Minister, Foreign Minister, and minister for foreign trade, cooperation, the economy, small and medium enterprises and justice.

From 1990 to 1999, she was the European Commission's Director-General for Culture, Communication and Sports, and later for translation.

From 1 January 1988 to 31 December 1999, she was a city councillor for Luxembourg City, and was later an alderman.

She was also the president of the European Institute of Cultural Routes (EICR).

References

|-

|-

|-

|-

|-

|-

|-

|-

1937 births
Living people
Deputy Prime Ministers of Luxembourg
Ministers for the Economy of Luxembourg
Ministers for Foreign Affairs of Luxembourg
Ministers for Justice of Luxembourg
Mayors of Luxembourg City
Members of the Chamber of Deputies (Luxembourg)
Members of the Chamber of Deputies (Luxembourg) from Centre
Councillors in Luxembourg City
Democratic Party (Luxembourg) politicians
Luxembourgian female foil fencers
Fencers at the 1960 Summer Olympics
Fencers at the 1964 Summer Olympics
Fencers at the 1968 Summer Olympics
Olympic fencers of Luxembourg
Luxembourgian sportsperson-politicians
People from Dudelange
Women mayors of places in Luxembourg
Wellesley College alumni
Democratic Party (Luxembourg) MEPs
MEPs for Luxembourg 1979–1984
MEPs for Luxembourg 1984–1989
MEPs for Luxembourg 1989–1994
MEPs for Luxembourg 1999–2004
20th-century women MEPs for Luxembourg
21st-century women MEPs for Luxembourg
The Fletcher School at Tufts University alumni
Women government ministers of Luxembourg
Female justice ministers
Luxembourgian women diplomats
Female foreign ministers